Gonzalo de Castro (born 2 February 1963, in Madrid) is a Spanish actor.

Biography
He studied law and graduated at age 23, but soon he decided to pursue acting. He debuted in the theatre play Por los pelos (1992). He had small roles in films and theater. In 1999 he started working on the series Siete Vidas as a helper and assistant director. The producer chose him for episodic character (Gonzalo, the owner of the bar) and that character became one of the main ones for seven years.
Finished Siete Vidas, De Castro starred Doctor Mateo (2009–2011), the Spanish remake of Doc Martin, for which he received several awards for best television actor in 2009 and 2010.
He has been boyfriend of the actresses Nathalie Poza (until 2008) and Natalia Verbeke (2010–2013).

Career

Television
7 vidas (1999–2006), in Telecinco
Doctor Mateo (2009–2011), in Antena 3
Matar al padre (2018), in Movistar+.
The Innocent (2021), in Netflix.

Films
Lisboa, faca no coração (1998), by Manuel Palacios
Coppola: Un hombre y sus sueños (1999), by Carlos Rodríguez
Gente pez (2001), by Jorge Iglesias
Madagascar (2005, Spanish voice of David Schwimmer), by Eric Darnell & Tom McGrath
La torre de Suso (2007), by Tom Fernández
Rivales (2008), by Fernando Colomo
¿Para qué sirve un oso? (2011), by Tom Fernández
Las furias (2016)
Superlópez (2018)

References

External links
 https://www.imdb.com/name/nm0207891/

1963 births
Living people
Male actors from Madrid
Spanish male film actors
Spanish male stage actors
Spanish male television actors
20th-century Spanish male actors
21st-century Spanish male actors